Troodontinae is a subfamily of troodontid dinosaurs. The subfamily was first used in 2017 for the group of troodontids descended from the last common ancestor of Gobivenator mongoliensis and Zanabazar junior, but has been redefined to be the least inclusive clade containing Saurornithoides mongoliensis and Troodon formosus, utilizing the type species of the clade.

Classification
Below is a cladogram of the Troodontinae as published by Aaron van der Reest and Phil Currie, in 2017.

References

Troodontids
Late Cretaceous dinosaurs